The 2013 IAAF Race Walking Challenge was the tenth edition of the annual international racewalking series organised by the International Association of Athletics Federations (IAAF).

Calendar 

The following meetings, as well as the competition final, formed the schedule of the 2013 Race Walking Challenge.
The "A" category meetings are worth the most points, with progressively fewer points being available through the "B" and "C" categories.

Winners

References 

World Athletics Race Walking Tour
Race Walking Challenge